Yvonne Hirdman (born 18 January 1943) is a Swedish historian and gender researcher. She has received many awards for her work including the August Prize.

Early years and education
Yvonne Hirdman is the daughter of the language teacher Einar Hirdman (1916–1999) and Charlotte Hirdman, born Schledt (1906–1966), and granddaughter of Gunnar and Maj Hirdman. She is the mother of Anja Hirdman and sister of Sven Hirdman. She grew up in Hökarängen, Malmberget. and Oskarshamn. She received a bachelor's degree in 1968 and PhD in 1974 at Stockholm University with the thesis of Sveriges Kommunistiska Parti 1939–1945 ("Swedish Communist Party 1939–1945").

Career
She has, among other things, conducted gender-oriented research and is particularly known for having in Sweden launched the concept of "genus". Her theories came first to have an impact on the state power investigation, where she was one of the members. She has been a professor of history at the University of Gothenburg, working at the Institute for Working Life; professor of contemporary history at Södertörn University; and professor of history at Stockholm University, where, as of 2017, she is professor emerita in the history department.

The concept of gender became helpful when talking about the "female" or the "male" in a context of cultural and social rather than  biological. In 1988, Hirdman published a report at the University of Gothenburg in book form entitled: The Genus System: theoretical considerations about women's social subordination, the Power Investigation. It was in this report that Hirdman wrote about the concept of gender in its importance in the Swedish language and then the concept was launched in the Swedish language. In 2004 she wrote a book by the title: The Genus System - Reflections on Women's Social Subordination. In 2001, Hirdman published her first edition of the book Genus, about the changing forms of stability. A newer edition was published in 2003 with the same title.

In 2015, her autobiography was published, Medan jag var ung ("While I was young").

Selected works
Sveriges kommunistiska parti 1939–1945. Sverige under andra världskriget. Stockholm: Allmänna förl. 1974. Libris 7257729
Vi bygger landet: den svenska arbetarrörelsens historia från Per Götrek till Olof Palme. Solna: Pogo press. 1979. Libris 7639436
Mat som vetenskap, utopi och ideologi. 1980. Libris 3172972
Magfrågan: mat som mål och medel : Stockholm 1870–1920. Tema nova. Stockholm: Rabén & Sjögren. 1983. Libris 8349157
Olof Petersson och Yvonne Hirdman (1985). Två föredrag om maktutredningen: TAMs, TBVs och TCOs tematräff om den politiska makten och folkstyret den 5 December 1985. Uppsala: Maktutredningen. Libris 556019
Om makt. Uppsala: Maktutredningen. 1986. Libris 556040
Genussystemet: teoretiska funderingar kring kvinnors sociala underordning. Uppsala: Maktutredningen. 1988. Libris 753181
Att lägga livet till rätta: studier i svensk folkhemspolitik. Stockholm: Carlsson. 1989. Libris 7665869
The gender system: theoretical reflections on the social subordination of women. Uppsala: Maktutredningen. 1990. Libris 883049
Den socialistiska hemmafrun och andra kvinnohistorier. Stockholm: Carlsson. 1992. Libris 8376656
Utopia in the home: an essay. International journal of political economy ; Vol. 22:2. Armonk, N.Y.: Sharpe. 1992. Libris 12000263
Folkhemstanken och kvinnorna: historiens andra sida. Samtal om rättvisa, 1103-2146 ; 9. Stockholm: Brevskolan. 1993. Libris 7431356
Narratives of subordination?. Reprint - Institutet för arbetslivsforskning, 1400-2027:19. Stockholm: Institutet för arbetslivsforskning. 1994. Libris 1975578
Social engineering and the woman question: Sweden in the thirties. Reprint - Institutet för arbetslivsforskning, 1400-2027:7. Stockholm: Institutet för arbetslivsforskning. 1994. Libris 1956049
Women - from possibility to problem?: gender conflict in the welfare state - the Swedish model. Research report series / Arbetslivscentrum, 1103-2499:3. Stockholm: Arbetslivscentrum. 1994. Libris 1777349
Genusanalys av välfärdsstaten: en utmaning av dikotomierna. Reprint - Institutet för arbetslivsforskning, 1400-2027:5. Stockholm: Institutet för arbetslivsforskning. 1994. Libris 1947234
Påminnelser: om kvinnors liv i Sverige. Stockholm: Carlsson. 1995. Libris 7666498
Med kluven tunga: LO och genusordningen. Stockholm: Atlas. 1998. Libris 7777514
Genus: om det stabilas föränderliga former. Malmö: Liber. 2001. Libris 8354469
Key concepts in feminist theory: analysing gender and welfare. Freia 0907-2179 34. Aalborg: Freia, Feminist Research Centre in Aalborg, Department of Development and Planning, Aalborg University. 2001. Libris 8954150
Det tänkande hjärtat: boken om Alva Myrdal. Stockholm: Ordfront. 2006. Libris 10141468
Gösta och genusordningen: feministiska betraktelser. Stockholm: Ordfront. 2007. Libris 10425277
Den röda grevinnan: en europeisk historia. Stockholm: Ordfront. 2010. Libris 11744243
Vad bör göras? : jämställdhet och politik under femtio år. Stockholm: Ordfront. 2014. Libris 15122351
Medan jag var ung : ego-historia från 1900-talet. Stockholm: Ordfront. 2015. Libris 17048945

Awards
 2003 – Årets väckarklocka
 2005 – Kellgrenpriset
 2010 – Hertig Karls prize
 2010 – August Prize
 2016 – Moa Award

References

Citations

External links
 Yvonne Hirdman at historia,su.se
 Yvonne Hirdman at libris.kb.se

1943 births
Living people
Stockholm University alumni
Academic staff of the University of Gothenburg
Academic staff of Södertörn University
Academic staff of Stockholm University
Gender studies academics
20th-century Swedish historians
Swedish women historians
21st-century Swedish historians
20th-century Swedish women writers
21st-century Swedish women writers